Giuseppe Ticozzelli (30 April 1894 – 3 February 1962) was an Italian footballer who played as a defender. On 18 January 1920, he represented the Italy national football team on the occasion of a friendly match against France in a 9–4 home win.

A cycling enthusiast, Ticozzelli decided to participate to the 1926 Giro d'Italia as an independent, wearing a black jersey. He completed three stages, but since he ran alone without soigneurs, he had to stop at taverns in order to eat, with considerable loss of time. He retired during the fourth stage after being hit by a motorcycle. Remembering his unorthodox participation, in the 1946 Giro d'Italia it was introduced the maglia nera (black jersey), awarded to the last cyclist to finish the race.

Later, he left for Italian East Africa as a military volunteer, and lost his eyesight fighting against Abyssinian guerrillas.

References

1894 births
1962 deaths
Italian footballers
Italy international footballers
Association football defenders
U.S. Alessandria Calcio 1912 players
S.P.A.L. players
Casale F.B.C. players
Italian people in Italian East Africa